The Australian Women's Masters is a chess tournament that has been held in Melbourne, Australia, annually since January 2013. The tournament is an invitational event, normally run as a 10-player round-robin tournament. The regular organisers and sponsors of the tournament have been Gary Bekker and Jamie Kenmure.

Winners 
 2017  Emily Rosmait
 2016  Gu Xiaobing
 2015  Julia Ryjanova
 2014  Irine Kharisma Sukandar
 2013  Katherine Jarek

See also

References

Women's chess competitions
Chess in Australia